Anna Christina Balazs (born 1953) is an American materials scientist and engineer. She currently is Distinguished Professor at the University of Pittsburgh and holds the John A. Swanson Chair at the Swanson School of Engineering.

Her research involves developing theoretical and computational models to capture the behavior of polymeric materials, nanocomposites and multi-component fluids in confined geometries. In 2016, Balazs was the first woman to receive the Polymer Physics Prize from the American Physical Society “for imaginative and insightful use of theory to understand multi-component polymeric systems.” In 2021 she was elected to the National Academy of Sciences for contributions to computational materials science and in 2022 was elected to the National Academy of Engineering for "creative and imaginative work in predicting the behavior of soft materials that are composed of multiple cooperatively - interacting components."

Balazs is a Fellow of the American Physical Society, the Royal Society of Chemistry, and the Materials Research Society.

Early life and education

Balalzs was born to Holocaust survivors in Hungary. She was inspired by her father who was a veterinarian to go into science. Balazs received her B.A. degree with honors in Physics from Bryn Mawr College in 1975. She received her master's and PhD in Materials Science and Engineering from Massachusetts Institute of Technology (MIT), Cambridge, MA in 1981. During her Ph.D. she worked with George M. Whitesides, K.H. Johnson, and Robert Silbey. After her Ph.D., she worked as a postdoctoral researcher at Brandeis University (1981-1983) in the Chemistry Department with Irving Epstein. She became a research associate at the University of Massachusetts (1984-1986) in the Polymer Science and Engineering Department with Frank Karasz, William MacKnight, and Isaac Sanchez.

Research and career

In 1987 she moved to the University of Pittsburgh where she became an Assistant Professor (1987-1992), an Associate Professor (1992-1999), and Bicentennial Engineering Alumni Faculty Fellow.Balazs research uses theoretical and computational modeling of the thermodynamic and kinetic behavior of polymer blends and composites. She has worked on developing models to design regenerating polymer gels. She is the Principal Investigator of the NSF Center for Chemo-Mechanical Assembly (CCMA), established through the National Science Foundation Centers for Chemical Innovation (CCI) Program. She has held the position of visiting professor at Scripps Research Institute in Southern California, the University of Texas at Austin, and Oxford University in the UK.

She was the Chair of the American Physical Society Division of Polymer Physics in 1999-2000. She has also served on the editorial board of Macromolecules,  Langmuir, Accounts of Chemical Research, Science Advances, and Soft Matter.

Awards and achievements
 Member of the National Academy of Engineering
 Member of the National Academy of Sciences
 Fellow of the American Physical Society,
 Fellow of the Royal Society of Chemistry 
 Fellow of the Materials Research Society,
2016 American Physical Society Polymer Physics Prize
2015 Royal Society of Chemistry S F Boys-A Rahman Award
2014 American Chemical Society Langmuir Lecture Award
2013 Mines Medal from the South Dakota School of Mines
 2003 Maurice Huggins Memorial Award of the Gordon Research Conference for outstanding contributions to Polymer Science 
 1999- 2000 Chair of the American Physical Society Division of Polymer Physics in 1999–2000,
 Special Creativity Prize from the National Science Foundation

References

1953 births
Living people
University of Pittsburgh faculty
21st-century American engineers
MIT School of Engineering alumni
Bryn Mawr College alumni